Dainava military district (also Dainava partisans military district) is a military district of Lithuanian partisans which operated in 1945–1951 in the counties of Alytus, Lazdijai and Varėna in Dainava (Dzūkija). The most significant battles: on May 17, 1945, in the Kalniškės Forest of the Simnas rural district in the Alytus district (44 partisans killed, about 400 NKVD intruders killed); on June 14, 1945, in the Varčia Forest of the Daugai rural district (40 partisans killed or were arrested, about 176 NKVD intruders were killed).

Leaders

Structure of Lithuanian partisans' organisation

References

External links
Genocide and Resistance Research Centre of Lithuania
The partisan military districts of the Lithuanian freedom fighters
Vienui Vieni ("Utterly Alone") 2004 film about the Lithuanian Forest Brothers, based on the real life events of Juozas Lukša aka Juozas L. Daumantas
War Chronicle of the Partisans – Chronicle of Lithuanian partisans, June 1944 – May 1949, prepared by Algis Rupainis
Forest Brothers – Fight for the Baltics – official YouTube channel of NATO, 2017

Military districts of Lithuanian partisans
Lithuanian partisans
Guerrilla organizations